Yvonne Choquet-Bruhat (born 29 December 1923) is a French mathematician and physicist. She has made seminal contributions to the study of Einstein's general theory of relativity, by showing that the Einstein equations can be put into the form of an initial value problem which is well-posed. In 2015, her breakthrough paper was listed by the journal Classical and Quantum Gravity as one of thirteen 'milestone' results in the study of general relativity, across the hundred years in which it had been studied.

She was the first woman to be elected to the French Academy of Sciences and is a Grand Officier of the Légion d'honneur.

Biographical sketch
Yvonne Bruhat was born in Lille in 1923. Her mother was the philosophy professor Berthe Hubert and her father was the physicist Georges Bruhat, who died in 1945 in the concentration camp Oranienburg-Sachsenhausen.  Her brother François Bruhat also became a mathematician, making notable contributions to the study of algebraic groups.

Bruhat undertook her secondary school education in Paris. In 1941 she entered the prestigious Concours Général national competition, winning the silver medal for physics. From 1943 to 1946 she studied at the École Normale Supérieure in Paris, and from 1946 was a teaching assistant there and undertook research advised by André Lichnerowicz.

From 1949 to 1951 she was a research assistant at the French National Centre for Scientific Research, as a result of which she received her doctorate.

In 1951, she became a postdoctoral researcher at the Institute for Advanced Study in Princeton, New Jersey. Her supervisor, Jean Leray, suggested that she study the dynamics of the Einstein field equations. He also introduced her to Albert Einstein, whom she consulted with a few times further during her time at the Institute.

In 1952, Bruhat and her husband were both offered jobs at Marseilles, precipitating her early departure from the Institute. In the same year, she published the local existence and uniqueness of solutions to the vacuum Einstein Equations, her most renowned achievement. Her work proves the well-posedness of the Einstein equations, and started the study of dynamics in General Relativity.

In 1947, she married fellow mathematician Léonce Fourès. Their daughter Michelle is now (as of 2016) an ecologist. Her doctoral work and early research is under the name Yvonne Fourès-Bruhat. In 1960, Bruhat and Fourès divorced, with her later marrying the mathematician Gustave Choquet and changing her last name to Choquet-Bruhat. She and Choquet had two children; her son, Daniel Choquet, is a neuroscientist and her daughter, Geneviève, is a doctor.

Career
In 1958, she was awarded the CNRS Silver Medal. From 1958 to 1959 she taught at the University of Reims.  In 1960 she became a professor at the Université Pierre-et-Marie-Curie (UPMC) in Paris, and has remained professor or professor emeritus until her retirement in 1992.

At the  she continued to make significant contributions to mathematical physics, notably in general relativity, supergravity, and the non-Abelian gauge theories of the standard model. Her work in 1981 with Demetrios Christodoulou showed the existence of global solutions of the Yang-Mills, Higgs, and Spinor Field Equations in 3+1 Dimensions. Additionally in 1984 she made perhaps the first study by a mathematician of supergravity with results that can be extended to the currently important model in D=11 dimensions.

In 1978 Yvonne Choquet-Bruhat was elected a correspondent to the Academy of Sciences and on 14 May 1979 became the first woman to be elected a full member. In 1985 she was elected to the American Academy of Arts and Sciences. In 1986 she was chosen to deliver the prestigious  Noether Lecture by the Association for Women in Mathematics.

Technical research contributions 

Choquet-Bruhat's best-known research deals with the mathematical nature of the initial data formulation of general relativity. A summary of results can be phrased purely in terms of standard differential geometric objects.
In this sense, an initial data set can be viewed as the prescription of the submanifold geometry of an embedded spacelike hypersurface in a Lorentzian manifold.
 An initial data set  satisfies the vacuum constraint equations, or is said to be a vacuum initial data set, if the following two equations are satisfied:

One of Choquet-Bruhat's seminal 1952 results states the following:

Such a development is called a globally hyperbolic vacuum development. Choquet-Bruhat also proved a uniqueness theorem:

In an article written with Robert Geroch in 1969, Choquet-Bruhat fully clarified the nature of uniqueness. With a two-page argument in point-set topology using Zorn's lemma, they showed that Choquet-Bruhat's above existence and uniqueness theorems automatically imply a global uniqueness theorem:

It is now common to study such developments.

Choquet-Bruhat's proof makes use of a clever choice of coordinates, the wave coordinates (which are the Lorentzian equivalent to the harmonic coordinates), in which the Einstein equations become a system of hyperbolic partial differential equations, for which well-posedness results can be applied.

Major Publications
Articles
 Fourès-Bruhat, Y. Théorème d'existence pour certains systèmes d'équations aux dérivées partielles non linéaires. Acta Math. 88 (1952), 141–225.    
 Choquet-Bruhat, Yvonne; Geroch, Robert. Global aspects of the Cauchy problem in general relativity. Comm. Math. Phys. 14 (1969), 329–335. doi:10.1007/BF01645389 
Survey articles
 Bruhat, Yvonne. The Cauchy problem. Gravitation: An introduction to current research, pp. 130–168, Wiley, New York, 1962.
 Choquet-Bruhat, Yvonne; York, James W., Jr. The Cauchy problem. General relativity and gravitation, Vol. 1, pp. 99–172, Plenum, New York-London, 1980.
 Choquet-Bruhat, Yvonne. Positive-energy theorems. Relativity, groups and topology, II (Les Houches, 1983), 739–785, North-Holland, Amsterdam, 1984.
 Choquet-Bruhat, Yvonne. Results and open problems in mathematical general relativity. Milan J. Math. 75 (2007), 273–289. 
 Choquet-Bruhat, Yvonne. Beginnings of the Cauchy problem for Einstein's field equations. Surveys in differential geometry 2015. One hundred years of general relativity, 1–16, Surv. Differ. Geom., 20, Int. Press, Boston, MA, 2015.
Technical books
 Choquet-Bruhat, Yvonne; DeWitt-Morette, Cécile; Dillard-Bleick, Margaret. Analysis, manifolds and physics. Second edition. North-Holland Publishing Co., Amsterdam-New York, 1982. xx+630 pp. 
 Choquet-Bruhat, Yvonne; DeWitt-Morette, Cécile. Analysis, manifolds and physics. Part II. North-Holland Publishing Co., Amsterdam, 1989. xii+449 pp. 
 Choquet-Bruhat, Y. Distributions. (French) Théorie et problèmes. Masson et Cie, Éditeurs, Paris, 1973. x+232 pp.
 Choquet-Bruhat, Yvonne. General relativity and the Einstein equations. Oxford Mathematical Monographs. Oxford University Press, Oxford, 2009. xxvi+785 pp.  
 Choquet-Bruhat, Y. Géométrie différentielle et systèmes extérieurs. Préface de A. Lichnerowicz. Monographies Universitaires de Mathématiques, No. 28 Dunod, Paris 1968 xvii+328 pp. 
 Choquet-Bruhat, Yvonne. Graded bundles and supermanifolds. Monographs and Textbooks in Physical Science. Lecture Notes, 12. Bibliopolis, Naples, 1989. xii+94 pp. 
 Choquet-Bruhat, Yvonne. Introduction to general relativity, black holes, and cosmology. With a foreword by Thibault Damour. Oxford University Press, Oxford, 2015. xx+279 pp. 
 Choquet-Bruhat, Y. Problems and solutions in mathematical physics. Translated from the French by C. Peltzer. Translation editor, J.J. Brandstatter Holden-Day, Inc., San Francisco, Calif.-London-Amsterdam 1967 x+315 pp.

Popular book
 Choquet-Bruhat, Yvonne. A lady mathematician in this strange universe: memoirs. Translated from the 2016 French original. World Scientific Publishing Co. Pte. Ltd., Hackensack, NJ, 2018. x+351 pp.

Awards
 Médaille d'Argent du Centre National de la Recherche Scientifique, 1958
 Prix Henri de Parville of the Académie des Sciences, 1963
 Member (since 1965),  (President 1980-1983) 
 Member, Académie des Sciences, Paris (elected 1979)
 Elected to the American Academy of Arts and Sciences 1985
 Association for Women in Mathematics Noether Lecturer, 1986
 Commandeur de la Légion d'honneur, 1997
 Dannie Heineman Prize for Mathematical Physics, 2003
 She was elevated to the 'Grand Officier' and 'Grand Croix' dignities in the Légion d'Honneur in 2008.

References

External links

Contributions of 20th Century Women to Physics'
"Yvonne Choquet-Bruhat", Biographies of Women Mathematicians, Agnes Scott College

Mathematical physicists
PDE theorists
1923 births
Living people
French women mathematicians
French women physicists
Grand Officiers of the Légion d'honneur
Members of the French Academy of Sciences
Academic staff of the University of Reims Champagne-Ardenne
Academic staff of the University of Paris
École Normale Supérieure alumni
Scientists from Lille
20th-century French mathematicians
20th-century French physicists
20th-century French women scientists
20th-century women mathematicians